Thimmapur is a village in Jangaon district of the Indian state of Telangana. It is located in Zaffergadh mandal.

References 

Villages in Jangaon district